St Cross Road is a road in Oxford, England. It links South Parks Road to the north and Longwall Street to the south, where it also meets Holywell Street. The road is named after St Cross Church.

Linacre College, one of the colleges in the University of Oxford, is located at the northern end, opposite the Tinbergen Building, used by the university's Department of Zoology and Department of Experimental Psychology. St Catherine's College, another Oxford University college, is in Manor Road, a cul de sac east off St Cross Road. The Oxford University Faculty of Law and Bodleian Law Library are on the corner with Manor Road. Holywell Manor, St Cross Church, Holywell Cemetery, and Jowett Walk are at the southern end.

St Cross College (now in St Giles'), one of the Oxford University colleges, used to be located in St Cross Road. The College still has an Annexe here.

Gallery

References

Streets in Oxford
St Cross College, Oxford